is a Japanese football player who plays for ReinMeer Aomori.

Career statistics
Updated to 8 March 2018.

References

External links

Profile at YSCC Yokohama
Profile at Nagano Parceiro

1993 births
Living people
Association football people from Saitama Prefecture
Japanese footballers
J1 League players
J2 League players
J3 League players
Japan Football League players
Urawa Red Diamonds players
Avispa Fukuoka players
Gainare Tottori players
YSCC Yokohama players
ReinMeer Aomori players
AC Nagano Parceiro players
Association football midfielders